The International Criminal Court has 

The Court's Pre-Trial Chambers 

As of September 2010, the Office of the Prosecutor had received 8,874 communications about alleged crimes. After initial review, 4,002 of these communications were dismissed as "manifestly outside the jurisdiction of the Court".

Overview

Opening investigation

The Prosecutor may open an investigation under three circumstances:
 when a situation is referred to by a state party;
 when a situation is referred by the United Nations Security Council, acting to address a threat to international peace and security; or
 when authorised by the Pre-Trial Chamber to open an investigation on the basis of information received from other sources, such as individuals or non-governmental organisations.

Of the nine cases that the Prosecutor had started investigating, five had been referred by states parties, two had been referred by the Security Council, and two had been authorised by the Pre-Trial Chamber to open an investigation, based on information received from other sources.

Active investigations

Uganda 

In December 2003, the government of Uganda, a state party, referred to the Prosecutor the situation concerning the Lord's Resistance Army in Northern Uganda. The Prosecutor decided to open an investigation into the matter on 29 July 2004, and on 5 July, it was assigned to Pre-Trial Chamber II.

On 8 July 2005, the Court issued its first public arrest warrants for five senior leaders of the LRA alleging:
 Leader Joseph Kony committed the crimes against humanity of murder, enslavement, sexual enslavement, rape and serious bodily injury and the war crimes of murder, cruel treatment of civilians, attacking civilians, pillage, inducing rape and enlisting child soldiers
 Kony's deputy, Vincent Otti, committed the crimes against humanity of murder, sexual enslavement and serious bodily injury and the war crimes of inducing rape, attacking civilians, enlisting child soldiers, cruel treatment of civilians, pillage and murder
 Army Commander of the LRA Okot Odiambo committed the crime against humanity of enslavement and war crimes of attacking civilians, pillage and enlisting child soldiers; he reportedly led an attack on Barlonyo refugee camp (Aromo sub-county, Erute north constituency, Lira District) in February 2004 in which more than 300 people were massacred.
 LRA commander Raska Lukwiya committed the crime against humanity of enslavement and the war crimes of cruel treatment of civilians, attacking civilians and pillage
 LRA commander Dominic Ongwen committed the crimes against humanity of murder, enslavement and serious bodily injury and the war crimes of murder, cruel treatment of civilians, attacking civilians and pillage

Initially, none of the indictees was arrested, but Lukwiya was killed in fighting on 12 August 2006, Otti is said to have been killed in 2007, apparently by Kony. The three other suspects are believed to be either in Southern Sudan or the northwestern Ituri Province of the Democratic Republic of the Congo.

The government of Uganda is currently in peace talks with the LRA. The LRA's leaders have repeatedly demanded immunity from ICC prosecution in return for an end to the insurgency. The government says it is considering establishing a national tribunal that meets international standards, thereby allowing the ICC warrants to be set aside.

On 4 February 2021, Dominic Ongwen was found guilty of 61 crimes by Trial Chamber IX of ICC, comprising crimes against humanity and war crimes, committed in Northern Uganda between 1 July 2002 and 31 December 2005. He was sentenced to 25 years of imprisonment. He has appealed against both conviction and sentence, and that appeal is currently being decided.

Democratic Republic of the Congo

In March 2004, the government of the Democratic Republic of the Congo, referred to the Prosecutor "the situation of crimes within the jurisdiction of the Court allegedly committed anywhere in the territory of the DRC since the entry into force of the Rome Statute, on 1 July 2002." On 23 June, the Prosecutor decided to open an investigation into the matter, and on 4 July, the case was allocated to Pre-Trial Chamber I. In February 2008, at the time of the arrest of the third suspect, the Prosecutor announced that the arrest had closed the ICC investigations in Ituri.

Thomas Lubanga
On 17 March 2006, Thomas Lubanga, former leader of the Union of Congolese Patriots militia in Ituri, became the first person to be arrested under a warrant issued by the court and the first suspect to face trial at the ICC. A sealed (secret) warrant had been issued for his arrest on 10 February 2006 for the war crimes of using child soldiers. He was flown to the court the same day in a French military aircraft. The prosecutor has stated that his trial will be only on the allegation of using child soldiers, and other allegations will be followed up in a subsequent prosecution.

Originally, Lubanga's trial was to begin on 23 June 2008, but it was halted on 13 June when the Court ruled that the Prosecutor's refusal to disclose potentially exculpatory material had breached Lubanga's right to a fair trial. The Prosecutor had obtained the evidence from the United Nations and other sources on condition of confidentiality, but judges ruled that the Prosecutor had incorrectly applied the relevant provision of the Rome Statute and so "the trial process has been ruptured to such a degree that it is now impossible to piece together the constituent elements of a fair trial". The Court lifted the suspension on 18 November 2008; Lubanga's trial began on 26 January 2009.

On 14 March 2012, the Court, by unanimous verdict of the Trial Chamber, found Lubanga guilty as a co-perpetrator in the use of child soldiers. Lubanga was sentenced to 14 years of imprisonment and was released on 15 March 2020.

Germain Katanga and Mathieu Ngudjolo Chui

Two more participants in the Ituri conflict, Germain Katanga and Mathieu Ngudjolo Chui, were also surrendered to the Court by the Congolese authorities. Both men are charged with six counts of war crimes and three counts of crimes against humanity, relating to an attack on the village of Bogoro on 24 February 2003 in which at least 200 civilians were killed, survivors were imprisoned in a room filled with corpses, and women and girls were sexually enslaved. The charges against both men include murder, sexual slavery and using children under 15 years to participate actively in hostilities.

Katanga, the former leader of the Ngiti-majority Front for Patriotic Resistance of Ituri militia, was transferred to the Court on 17 October 2007; Ngudjolo, former leader of the National Integrationist Front, was transferred to the Court on 6 February 2008. The hearing to confirm the charges against them began on 27 June 2008. The trial against the two men started on 24 November 2009.

On 7 March 2014, Katanga was found guilty as an accessory of one count of crime against humanity and four counts of war crimes, committed on 24 February 2003, during an attack on the village of Bogoro, in Congo. He was sentenced to 12 years' imprisonment on 23 May 2014.

Mathieu Ngudjolo Chui was acquitted, on 18 December 2012, of the charges of crimes against humanity and war crimes, and was ordered for immediate release. This verdict was upheld by the Appeals Chamber on 27 February 2015.

Callixte Mbarushimana
On 20 August 2010, the Prosecutor requested Pre-Trial Chamber I to issue a warrant of arrest against Callixte Mbarushimana. He is alleged to have been the Executive Secretary of the Forces démocratiques de libération du Rwanda – Forces Combattantes Abacunguzi (FDLR-FCA, FDLR). On 28 September 2010, the Pre-Trial Chamber complied with the request and issued a sealed warrant of arrest which was unsealed on 11 October 2010, the day that French authorities arrested Mbarushimana. The suspect was transferred to the ICC on 25 January 2011. His confirmation of charges hearing was held from 16 to 21 September 2011. By a 2–1 majority, Pre-Trial Chamber I ruled on 16 December 2011 that the confirmation was declined. After the Prosecutor's appeal against the decision was rejected, Mbarushimana was released on 23 December 2011.

Central African Republic
In December 2004, the government of the Central African Republic, a state party, referred to the Prosecutor "the situation of crimes within the jurisdiction of the Court committed anywhere on the territory of the Central African Republic since 1 July 2002, the date of entry into force of the Rome Statute".

On 13 April 2006, the Court of Cassation of the Central African Republic investigating charges or murder and rape committed by former President Ange-Felix Patasse and Congolese Vice-President Jean-Pierre Bemba said that they could not secure the arrest of the suspects despite international arrest warrants, and they requested the ICC to take responsibility. The allegations against Bemba date to when his Movement for the Liberation of Congo rebel army was invited by Patasse into the capital, Bangui, to fight rebels who were fighting against Patasse. Also referred to the court were the cases of a French policeman and two aides of Patasse who were all involved in the alleged crimes, which human rights groups allege had about 400 victims.

Local activists from the Union of Central African Journalists (UJCA) have also accused the President, François Bozizé, of committing genocide against the inhabitants of the north Central African Republic, who supported the former regime, after seizing power in 2003, and he asked the court to prosecute Bozizé.

In November 2005, the Office of the Prosecutor held meetings with the government, judiciary authorities, civil society and international community representatives in CAR to gather additional information for the preliminary analysis.

In September 2006, the government filed a complaint with the court that claimed the Prosecutor had failed to decide within a reasonable time whether or not to investigate. In response the pre-trial chamber ordered the prosecutor to submit a report by 15 December 2006 as to the current status of the investigation and an estimate of when a decision on whether to investigate will be made.

On 22 May 2007, the Prosecutor announced his decision to open an investigation, focusing on allegations of killing and rape in 2002 and 2003, a period of intense fighting between government and rebel forces. The case has been allocated to Pre-Trial Chamber III.

On 24 May 2008, former Vice-President Jean-Pierre Bemba was arrested during a visit to Belgium under a sealed warrant under accusations of war crimes and crimes against humanity committed in CAR He was transferred to the ICC on 3 July 2008. His confirmation of charges hearing, taking place from 12 to 15 January 2009, resulted in the charges being confirmed on 15 June 2009. His trial began on 22 November 2010. He was acquitted from the charges of war crimes and crimes against humanity by the Appeals Chamber on 8 June 2018.

On December 16, 2022, the Prosecutor announced the conclusion of investigations in the situation of Central African Republic.

Darfur, Sudan

On 31 March 2005, the United Nations Security Council passed Resolution 1593, referring "the situation prevailing in Darfur since 1 July 2002" to the Prosecutor. The Prosecutor opened an investigation into the situation on 6 June, and the case was allocated to Pre-Trial Chamber I.

Ahmed Haroun and Ali Muhammad Ali Abd-Al-Rahman 
In February 2007 the Prosecutor announced that two men (Sudanese humanitarian affairs minister Ahmad Muhammad Harun and Janjaweed militia leader Abd-Al-Rahman) had been identified as key suspects, accused of war crimes and crimes against humanity. On 2 May 2007, the Court issued arrest warrants for the two men. However, Sudan claims the Court has no jurisdiction over this matter and refuses to hand over the suspects. Mr Abd-Al-Rahman was transferred to the ICC's custody on 9 June 2020, after surrendering himself voluntarily in the Central African Republic. His initial appearance before the ICC took place on 15 June 2020. He is charged with 31 counts of war crimes and crimes against humanity allegedly committed in Darfur, Sudan, between August 2003 and at least April 2004. The trial for these charges began on April 5, 2022.

Omar al-Bashir

On 14 July 2008, the Prosecutor accused Sudanese President Omar al-Bashir of genocide, crimes against humanity and war crimes. In July 2008, the Chief Prosecutor applied to the Court for an arrest warrant for President of Sudan Omar al-Bashir on ten counts of genocide, crimes against humanity and war crimes. In October, the Court asked the Prosecutor for more information to support the charges.

The court issued an arrest warrant for al-Bashir on 4 March 2009 for war crimes and crimes against humanity but ruled that there was insufficient evidence to prosecute him for genocide. Al-Bashir was the first sitting head of state indicted by the ICC. Al-Bashir denies all the charges by describing them as "not worth the ink they are written in". In July 2009, the member states of the African Union agreed not to co-operate in his arrest. Nevertheless, several African Union members who are also parties of the ICC, including South Africa and Uganda, let it be known that al-Bashir might be arrested if he entered their territory. However, in July and August 2010 al-Bashir traveled to Chad and Kenya, neither of which turned him over to the ICC despite being parties; the ICC has reported both member states to the UN Security Council and the ICC Assembly of States Parties.

On 3 February 2010, the Appeals Chamber of the ICC reversed the Pre-Trial Chamber's rejection of the genocide charge by ruling that the PTC had applied a too stringent standard of proof. Subsequently, the First Pre-Trial Chamber issued a second warrant of arrest against al-Bashir on 12 July 2010 in which he was charged with genocide against three ethnic groups in Darfur.

Omar Al Bashir is still at large, and is not within ICC custody.

Bahr Idriss Abu Garda
On 17 May 2009, it was the first time that a suspect appeared voluntarily before the Court. Bahr Idriss Abu Garda, commander of the United Resistance Front, a Darfuri rebel group, was accused of responsibility for the attack on the African Union's peace mission in Haskanita (North-Darfur) on 29 September 2007. In the attack, 12 soldiers were allegedly killed and eight injured. Abu Garda denies the charge but reported voluntarily by stating that "every leader should co-operate with justice and observe the law". A summons was issued against Abu Garda, but no warrant of arrest. He was allowed to await the further proceedings while in liberty.

On 8 February 2010, Pre-Trial Chamber I of the Court ruled that there was insufficient evidence to proceed to trial on charges against Abu Garda. On 23 April 2010, the Chamber also declined the Prosecutor's application to appeal the decision. Under the Rome Statute, such a move to the Appeals Chamber can only be made once leave of the Pre-Trial Chamber has been granted. Both decisions do not preclude the prosecution from subsequently requesting the confirmation of the charges against Abu Garda if such a request is supported by additional evidence.

Abdallah Banda and Saleh Jerbo
On 16 June 2010, two other rebel leaders came voluntarily to the Court. Abdallah Banda Abakaer Nourain (Banda) and Saleh Mohammed Jerbo Jamus (Jerbo), leaders of small Darfuri rebel groups, are also charged with war crimes for their alleged roles in the attack in Haskanita described above.

Prosecutor Moreno Ocampo stated that their voluntary appearance was the culmination of months of efforts to secure their co-operation. On 17 June 2010, they faced Pre-Trial Chamber I, which ruled that there are reasonable grounds for their prosecution. Just as in the case against Abu Garda, the Prosecutor has not made a request for warrants of arrest against them.

Abdallah Banda Abakaer Nourain and Saleh Mohammed Jerbo Jamus appeared voluntarily before the court on 17 June 2010. On 7 March 2011, Pre-Trial Chamber I confirmed the charges against the two and committed them to trial.

The proceedings against Saleh Mohammed Jerbo Jamus terminated on 4 October 2013 due to his passing.

On 11 September 2014, the Trial Chamber judges issued an arrest warrant to ensure Banda's presence at trial. Banda is still at large, and trial will commence pending his arrest or voluntary appearance.

Kenya

On 31 March 2010, a Pre-Trial Chamber of the International Criminal Court authorized the Prosecutor to investigate the 2007–2008 Kenyan crisis. It was the first time the Prosecutor had requested such an authorization; all other investigations have been triggered by either the corresponding government or the United Nations Security Council.

On 15 December 2010, the Prosecutor applied for summonses to appear for six alleged perpetrators: In the first case, William Ruto, Henry Kiprono Kosgey and Joshua Arap Sang are to stand trial for crimes against PNU supporters whereas, in the second case, Francis Muthaura, Uhuru Muigai Kenyatta and Mohamed Hussein Ali are to stand trial for crimes against ODM supporters. On 8 March 2011, the Pre-Trial Chamber issued summonses for all six alleged perpetrators to appear before the Court on 7 and 8 April 2011 respectively.

Libya 
As a consequence of the 2011 Libyan civil war and its brutal suppression, the UN Security Council voted unanimously, on 26 February 2011 in Resolution 1970, to refer the situation in Libya to the ICC. Other than the referral of the situation in Darfur, Sudan, to the ICC in March 2005, it was only the second time that the Security Council has referred a situation to the ICC and the first time that it has done so unanimously. China and the United States had abstained in 2005, but this time, they voted in favor of referral to the ICC.

On 3 March 2011, just five days after the referral of the situation, the Prosecutor opened an investigation. On 16 May 2011, the Prosecutor requested a Pre-Trial Chamber of the Court to issue warrants of arrest against Muammar Gaddafi; his son, Saif al-Islam; and the head of Libya's intelligence, Abdullah Senussi, for allegedly committed crimes against humanity. The request was granted on 27 June 2011, resulting in the second ICC warrant of arrest against an incumbent head of state, the other being Sudan's Omar al-Bashir.

Côte d'Ivoire 
On 19 May 2011, the Prosecutor informed the Presidency of the Court of his intention to request the authorization to open a formal investigation into the situation in Côte d'Ivoire since 28 November 2010. A day later, the Presidency issued an order, assigning the situation to Pre-Trial Chamber II, which was modified on 22 June 2011 by establishing a Pre-Trial Chamber III and assigning the situation in Côte d'Ivoire to it.

On 23 June 2011, the Prosecutor formally requested the authorization from a Pre-Trial Chamber to begin an investigation into crimes allegedly committed in Côte d'Ivoire.

While Côte d'Ivoire was then not a state party to the Rome Statute, it had repeatedly, by different administrations, accepted the ICC's jurisdiction. It became a state party in February 2013.

On 3 October 2011, Pre-Trial Chamber III allowed an investigation to be conducted by the Prosecutor.

On 27 May 2015, the ICC ruled that it can prosecute Simone Gbagbo on charges including murder and rape linked to violence that left 3000 people dead in the aftermath of the country's disputed 2010 presidential election.

Mali 
On 18 July 2012, the government of Mali had referred the situation there to the Prosecutor of the International Criminal Court. On 16 January 2013, the Prosecutor determined that there is a reasonable basis to believe that war crimes have been committed in the conflict so the Prosecutor opened an investigation.

Central African Republic II 
On 12 June 2014, the government of the Central African Republic had referred the second situation there to the Prosecutor of the International Criminal Court. On 24 September 2014, the Prosecutor determined that there is a reasonable basis to believe that war crimes have been committed in the conflict so the Prosecutor opened an investigation.

State of Palestine 

On 3 March 2021 prosecutor Fatou Bensouda announced the opening of an investigation respecting the situation in the State of Palestine. It considers alleged war crimes under the jurisdiction of the court that have been committed since 13 June 2014. After having requested a pre-trial jurisdictional ruling to first conform the territory within which the investigations may be conducted, the court found that the territorial scope of this jurisdiction extends to Gaza and the West Bank, including East Jerusalem.

Venezuela 

On 4 November 2021 prosecutor Karim Khan announced the opening of an investigation regarding the situation in Venezuela.

Preliminary examinations

In addition to the sixteen situations in which the Prosecutor has opened formal investigations, several other situations are under "preliminary examination": Bolivia, Guinea, Nigeria and Ukraine.

Preliminary examinations into situations in Korea, Comoros (regarding the Israeli attack on three vessels involved in the Gaza flotilla raid), Honduras and Gabon were also closed. In these cases, the Prosecutor concluded that no investigation would be initiated because the necessary requirements had not been met. With regard to the Israeli attack on the vessels of the Gaza flotilla raid, the Comoros appealed from the Prosecutor's decision. On 30 November 2017, this appeal was finally dismissed.

Preliminary examinations regarding Iraq and Venezuela were at some point closed but later on reopened. With regard to the 2003 invasion of Iraq, the Prosecutor published a letter responding to complaints he had received. He noted that "the International Criminal Court has a mandate to examine the conduct during the conflict, but not whether the decision to engage in armed conflict was legal", and that the court's jurisdiction is limited to the actions of nationals of states parties. He concluded that there was a reasonable basis to believe that a limited number of war crimes had been committed in Iraq, but that the crimes allegedly committed by nationals of states parties did not appear to meet the required gravity threshold for an ICC investigation. However, on 13 May 2014, the Prosecutor announced that preliminary examinations regarding the situation in Iraq are re-opened, due to communication received by the European Center for Constitutional and Human Rights regarding alleged war crimes by United Kingdom officials between 2003 and 2008.

Other complaints received

As of end September 2010, the Office of the Prosecutor had received 8874 communications about alleged crimes. After initial review, 4002 of the communications were dismissed as "manifestly outside the jurisdiction of the Court".

National proceedings under complementarity
The Court is designed to complement existing national judicial systems. It can exercise its jurisdiction only if national courts are unwilling or unable to investigate or prosecute. State parties are expected to implement national legislation to provide for the investigation and prosecution of crimes that fall under the jurisdiction of the Court.

Democratic Republic of the Congo
In February 2008, a military tribunal in Mbandaka sentenced Botuli Itofo, a policeman, to twenty years' imprisonment after his conviction under ICC implementing legislation for the crime against humanity of mass rape and other "serious human rights violations". Over 50 women and girls had expressed that they had been raped as a part of a "punitive operation" by police sent to the area to restore order in March 2006.

Germany
Under the German complementary law, crimes against humanity as defined in the Rome Statute can be prosecuted by German courts even if they are outside the jurisdiction of the court because they occur in a country that has not ratified the statute. That is under the principle of universal jurisdiction.

In December 2005, activists from Uzbekistan submitted a complaint against Uzbek Interior Minister Zokirjon Almatov in connection with the Andijan massacre. Almatov was visiting Germany at the time for hospital treatment. The prosecutor declined to act by saying chances of a successful prosecution were "non-existent" as the government of Uzbekistan would not co-operate in the gathering of evidence.

In May 2011, a trial against two alleged members of the FDLR began in Stuttgart, Germany. Ignace Murwanashyaka and Straton Musoni, both Rwandan citizens, are accused of 26 counts of crimes against humanity and 39 counts of war crimes, allegedly committed in the Democratic Republic of the Congo. It is the first trial in Germany under the Völkerstrafgesetzbuch in force since 2002.

References

External links
 United Nations International Criminal Tribunal for Rwanda
 Public Forum to discuss the International Criminal Court
 

 
International Criminal Court
Lord's Resistance Army
War in Darfur